George S. Parker High School is a comprehensive public high school located on the west side of the city of Janesville, Wisconsin. The school, named for George S. Parker, founder of the Parker Pen Company, is a part of the School District of Janesville and was constructed in 1967. The rival east side school is Joseph A. Craig High School.

In Nov 2006, a referendum passed that provided nearly $71 million for updates and renovation to both Parker and Craig High Schools. Construction began in October 2007 and lasted two years.

Athletics
The school sports teams compete in the Big Eight Conference. State level competition is governed by the Wisconsin Interscholastic Athletic Association (WIAA).

Baseball
1977 State champion; beat Middleton, 6-2

Basketball (boys)
1971 State champion; beat Milwaukee King, 79-68

Basketball (girls)
1993 State champion; beat Middleton, 58-40
2000 State champion; beat Hudson, 57-56
2001 State champion; beat Stevens Point 51-44

Notable alumni
 Mistie Bass, basketball player in the WNBA
 Steve Preston, administrator of the Small Business Administration, 2006-2008, and 14th Secretary of the U.S. Department of Housing and Urban Development (HUD), 2008-2009
 Terry Ryan, general manager of the Minnesota Twins
 Michael J. Sheridan, Wisconsin State Assembly

References

External links
 Parker High School homepage
 School District of Janesville homepage

Public high schools in Wisconsin
Educational institutions established in 1967
Parker High School
Schools in Rock County, Wisconsin
1967 establishments in Wisconsin